The Khartoum gerbil (Dipodillus stigmonyx) is found mainly in Sudan.

References

Musser, G. G. and M. D. Carleton. 2005. Superfamily Muroidea. pp. 894–1531 in Mammal Species of the World a Taxonomic and Geographic Reference. D. E. Wilson and D. M. Reeder eds. Johns Hopkins University Press, Baltimore.
  Database entry includes a brief justification of why this species is listed as data deficient.

Endemic fauna of Sudan
Dipodillus
Rodents of Africa
Mammals described in 1877
Taxobox binomials not recognized by IUCN